Line 60 is a railway line connecting Luxembourg City to the Red Lands of the south of Luxembourg, and on to France.  The terminus at the northern end is Luxembourg railway station, whilst the terminals at the south are Rumelange, Pétange, and the French towns of Volmerange-les-Mines and  Audun-le-Tiche.  It is designated, and predominantly operated, by Chemins de Fer Luxembourgeois.

Stations

 Luxembourg
 Berchem
 Bettembourg
 Dudelange-Burange
 Dudelange-Ville
 Dudelange-Centre
 Dudelange-Usines
 Volmerange-les-Mines (France)
 Noertzange
 Kayl
 Tétange
 Rumelange
 Schifflange
 Esch-sur-Alzette
 Audun-le-Tiche (France)
 Belval-Université
 Belval-Rédange
 Belvaux-Soleuvre
 Oberkorn
 Differdange
 Niederkorn
 Pétange
 Lamadelaine
 Rodange

Railway lines in Luxembourg